Savona may refer to:
Savona, Italy
Savona, British Columbia, Canada
Savona, New York, United States
Savona, Ohio, United States 
Sevona, a Lake Superior shipwreck off the coast of Wisconsin, USA.
Paolo Savona, Italian economist
The Musical Savonas, a British musical variety troupe also known as the Elliott-Savonas